Pat Miller may refer to:
 Pat Miller (coach), American football and basketball coach
 Pat Miller (politician), member of the Colorado House of Representatives
 Pat Miller (dog trainer), American dog trainer
 Pat Miller (Neighbours), a character on the Australian TV series Neighbours

See also
 Patrick Miller (disambiguation)
 Patricia Miller (disambiguation)